Liking may refer to:
A form of the English verb "like"
Use of a like option on social networking and some other websites
Reciprocal liking, a psychological phenomenon
Likin (taxation), in 19th- and 20th-century China

See also
Like (disambiguation)